HMS Lynx was one of 20 s built for the Royal Navy in the 1910s. Completed in 1914 she saw active service in the First World War.

Design and description
The ships displaced  at deep load and their crew numbered 73 officers and ratings.

The destroyers were powered by a single Parsons steam turbine that drove two propeller shafts using steam provided by four Yarrow boilers.

The primary armament of the ships consisted of three BL  Mk VIII guns in single, unprotected pivot mounts. One gun was on the forecastle and two were aft of the superstructure. The destroyers were equipped with a pair of single rotating mounts for 21-inch (533 mm) torpedo tubes amidships and carried two reload torpedoes.

Construction and career
Lynx was ordered under the 1911–1912 Naval Programme from the London and Glasgow Shipbuilding Company. The ship was laid down at the company's Govan shipyard on 18 January 1912, launched on 20 March 1913 and commissioned in January 1914.

Lynx left Cromarty with two half-divisions of the Fourth Destroyer Flotilla on 15 December 1914 as part of the response to the German bombardment of Scarborough. At 05:15 on 16 December 1914 she sighted the German destroyer , and summoned her destroyer squadron to investigate. In a brief skirmish which took place with a force of German destroyers and cruisers, Lynx was hit several times by German shells. She sustained minor damage to a propeller and her forward magazine was flooded but only had one man wounded. Her steering gear jammed and the rest of the force made the error of following her, thus ending the pursuit.

On 9 August 1915 Lynx struck a mine off the Moray Firth by the German raider Meteor and sank. Sixty-three men were lost, including her captain. Four officers and twenty-two ratings survived.

References

Bibliography

Further reading
 Massie, Robert (2004). Castles of Steel: Britain, Germany, and the Winning of the Great War at Sea. London: Jonathan Cape. .

External links
 

 

Acasta-class destroyers
World War I destroyers of the United Kingdom
1913 ships
Maritime incidents in 1915
Ships built on the River Clyde
Ships sunk by mines
World War I shipwrecks in the North Sea